Arsen Sargsyan (born 13 December 1984 in Vanadzor, Armenian SSR) is an Armenian long jumper.

He competed at the 2001 World Youth Championships and the 2009 European Indoor Championships without reaching the final. He competed at the 2012 Summer Olympics in the men's long jump. Sargsyan took 20th place in qualifying round at the 2013 European Athletics Indoor Championships with a jump of 7.44 meters. His personal best jump is 8.02 metres, achieved in May 2008 in Artashat.

Competition record

References

External links
Sports-Reference.com

1984 births
Living people
People from Vanadzor
Armenian male long jumpers
Olympic athletes of Armenia
Athletes (track and field) at the 2012 Summer Olympics